Tam Sheang Tsung (born 24 May 1995) is a Japanese-Malaysian professional footballer who plays as a midfielder for Malaysia M3 League side Kuala Lumpur Rovers . His parents are Malaysians.

Career

In 2009, Tsung joined the youth academy of Brazilian side São Bernardo.

At the age of 15, he trained with Cardiff City in the English second division.

In 2012, he joined the youth academy of Chinese club Shanghai Shenhua.

Before the 2014 season, Tsung joined the youth academy of Avispa Fukuoka in the Japanese second division.

Before the 2015 season, he signed for Japanese third division team Kataller Toyama.

Before the 2017 season, he signed for Melaka United in the Malaysian top flight.

In 2017, Tsung signed for Malaysian second division side KL City.

In 2018, he signed for Alcanenense in the Portuguese fourth division.

Before the 2020 season, he signed for Malaysian top flight side Kedah Darul Aman.

References

External links
 Tam Sheang Tsung at playmakerstats.com

Association football people from Tokyo
Malaysian footballers
Japanese people of Malaysian descent
Living people
Japanese footballers
Japanese expatriate footballers
Malaysian expatriate footballers
Expatriate footballers in China
Malaysia Super League players
Expatriate footballers in Malaysia
Kedah Darul Aman F.C. players
Expatriate footballers in Portugal
Japanese expatriate sportspeople in Malaysia
Japanese expatriate sportspeople in Portugal
Association football midfielders
1995 births
A.C. Alcanenense players